Full name: Nuzohn Zidenmaro Kulala
Date of birth: May 5, 1990
Place of birth: Monrovia, Liberia
Height: 5’10’’
Playing position: Winger/ Striker
Civil status: Married
Club information
Present club: Ghazl Mahalla
Jersey number: preferably 3

Previous clubs

Invaders FC (Division 3) Liberia 2004-2005
Alliance FC (Division 1) Liberia 2005-2006
Mighty Barrolle (Premier) Liberia 2006-2008
LISCR FC (Premier) Liberia 2008-2009
Mighty Barrolle (Premier) Liberia 2009-2010
Gazel El Mahalla (Division 2) Egypt 2010-2011
FC Fassel (Division 1) Liberia 2012-13, featured in 21 matches and scored 17 goals with several assists
Solleftea GIF FF (Sweden) played 18 matches, scored 11 goals 2013-14
Ghazl Mahalla (Egypt) played 20 matches 9 goals 2014-15 - 2017-18

Personal Narrative

Nuzohn Z. Kulala born on May 5, 1990 in Montserrado County, Monrovia, Liberia is a Professional Footballer. He holds a diploma from the St. Michael Catholic High School in Liberia. Currently lives in Egypt. He can be best described as resolute, focused, reserved and result oriented.

Career overview

Nuzohn is considered as one of the precocious left footed strikers as compared to many other Liberian players of the time. His ability to finish clinically well is his strength.  
Nuzohn started his career playing with a third division team in Liberia, Invaders FC in 2004-2005. After a successful season with the Invaders, he later joined the Alliance Football Club from 2005-2006. His excellent and creative talents further led him to one of Liberia's best premier teams, Mighty Barrolle. His role as a striker and outstanding talent led the club to win many medals and individual awards for the season from 2006 through 2008, thus making him the break-out player. Having attracted many other big teams, he landed a big contract with LISCR Football club, premier team right from 2008-2009. He continued to excel beyond expectations with more goals and assists almost all of the club's goals.

His speed, delivery and unrelenting records saw him being recalled by the Mighty Barrolle FC in 2009-2010. He has won all individual awards. After yet another successful year with Mighty Barrolle, he moved to Egypt in 2010-2011 featuring for Gazel El Mahalla a Second Division team.

He recently signed for FC Fassel in 2012-13, a premier team in Liberia where he played and scored as many goals as 17 goals after 21 matches, before he left for international opportunity with Solleftea GIF, Sweden. He is a player with high technical and physical skills; talented and creative. He plays most excellently as a striker and midfielder.
Nuzohn travelled to Sweden in 2013, and featured for the club Solleftea GIF FF. During his stay with the club, he played 18 matches and splendidly scored 11 goals along with several goal assists.

International Career/honor

 He participated twice in the African Champions league against Sewe Sports of Ivory Coast and Kano Pillars of Nigeria appearing in 4 games and 2 goals advantage.
 Liberia Senior National team: 12 caps, 4 goals 
DEBUT: Equatorial Guinea vs Liberia 2008 (2-1)
 He was named the Second Best Foreign Player by Gazel El Mahala

Honors statistics

Team	Years	Apps	Goals
LFA,3rd division National League	2004-2005	23	18
Joint Top scorer division 1	2005-2006	26	16
Top scorer Premier division	2009-2010	20	15

 Championship Medal Mighty Barrolle 2008-2009
 Most Value Player in Liberian Premier League : 2008-09
 Liberian Sports Papers' Athlete of the Year: 2006-07
 Liberian club's Highest Scorer : 2006–07 Mighty Barolle
 Liberian Most Valuable Youth Player: 2003-04
 Championship Knock-out Medal Mighty Barrolle
 Kulala had a trial with Safa Beirut SC of the Lebanese Premier League in 2007, but did not join the club

References

 Kulala - liberiansoccer.com

1990 births
Living people
Liberian footballers
Association football midfielders
Sportspeople from Monrovia